Manda is a given name and a surname which may refer to: Amanda

Given name
 Manda Aufochs Gillespie, ecological designer, environmental consultant, and author
 Manda Jagannath (born 1951), Indian politician
 Manda Vijay Mhatre, Indian politician elected in 2014
 Manda Ophuis (born 1980), Dutch singer and composer

Surname
 Carl Manda (1886-1983), American Major League Baseball player in September 1914
 Hisako Manda (born 1958), Japanese actress and 1978 Miss Universe contestant
 Kunitoshi Manda (born 1956), Japanese film director, screenwriter and film critic
 Lucenio Manda, Filipino activist and politician
 Milorad Mandić Manda (1961-2016), Serbian actor
 Siadabida Manda (born 1970), footballer from the Democratic Republic of Congo

Fictional characters
Manda, a monster from the 1963 film Atragon and a later monster in the Godzilla franchise

See also
 Amanda (name)
 Manda (disambiguation)

Unisex given names